The 1998 FIBA Europe Under-18 Championship was an international basketball  competition held in Bulgaria in 1998.

Final ranking

1. 

2. 

3. 

4. 

5. 

6. 

7. 

8. 

9. 

10. 

11. 

12.

Awards

External links
FIBA Archive

FIBA U18 European Championship
1998–99 in European basketball
1998 in Bulgarian sport
International youth basketball competitions hosted by Bulgaria